The Penghu Channel is the body of water that separates the Penghu islands from Taiwan island and links the Taiwan Strait to the northeastern South China Sea. The channel has been considered narrow and potentially difficult to navigate in monsoon season.

See also
 Penghu 1

References

Straits of Taiwan